Ahmed Mghirbi (17 June 1946 – 16 March 2021) was a Tunisian football player and coach.

Club career 
Born on 17 June 1946, in Manouba, Mghirbi began his career at Stade Tunisien as a centre-back; he played 256 matches between 1965 and 1975, scoring seven goals.

International career 
Mghirbi played for the Tunisia national team. He made his debut against Yugoslavia in 1966, and played his last match against Algeria in 1972. Mighirbi played 34 international matches, winning silver at the 1971 Mediterranean Games.

Managerial career 
Mghribi coached several clubs, namely Stade Tunisien, and Olympique Béja.

Personal life 
Mghirbi later served as an analyst for the television channel Nessma and Tunisian national programming.

Death 
On 16 March 2021, Mghibi died aged 74 after suffering from cancer for two years.

Honours

Player
Stade Tunisien
 Tunisian Cup: 

Tunisia
 Mediterranean Games Silver Medal: 1971

Individual
 Tunisian National Championship Top Scorer:

Coach
Stade Tunisien
 Tunisian Cup:

References

1946 births
2021 deaths
People from Manouba Governorate
Tunisian footballers
Association football central defenders
Stade Tunisien players
Tunisian Ligue Professionnelle 1 players
Tunisia international footballers
Tunisian football managers
Stade Tunisien managers
Olympique Béja managers
Tunisian Ligue Professionnelle 1 managers
Deaths from cancer in Tunisia